Apostolos Evangelou Vakalopoulos (11 August 1909 – 10 July 2000) was a distinguished Greek historian, specializing in the Byzantine Empire, Ottoman Greece, and in modern Greek history. Vakalopoulos has been described as one of the greatest Greek historians of the 20th century.

Biography 
Apostolos Vakalopoulos was born on 11 August 1909, in Volos, but grew up in Thessaloniki, where his family had settled in 1914. He graduated from the newly established Philological Faculty of the Aristotle University of Thessaloniki, and initially worked as a high school teacher in the 1930s.

In 1939, Vakalopoulos completed his doctorate at the University of Thessaloniki, and began a tenure as lecturer at the university's Philological Faculty in 1943, eventually becoming a professor in 1951. Vakalopoulos continued in the same position until his retirement in 1974.

Vakalopoulos was a founding member of the Society for Macedonian Studies in 1939, and a fixed presence in its board of governors. He also served as chairman of the Institute for Balkan Studies. Among numerous publications, the most well-known was his eight-volume History of Modern Hellenism series.

Vakalopoulos died in Thessaloniki on 10 July 2000.

References

External links 
 

20th-century Greek historians
1909 births
2000 deaths
Aristotle University of Thessaloniki alumni
Academic staff of the Aristotle University of Thessaloniki
Greek Byzantinists
Historians of modern Greece
People from Volos
Writers from Volos
Scholars of Byzantine history
Herder Prize recipients